Noughts + Crosses is a British drama television series based on the Noughts & Crosses novel series by Malorie Blackman. The series is set in an alternative history where black "Cross" people rule over white "Noughts".
The first episode aired on BBC One on 5 March 2020, and the remaining episodes premiered on BBC iPlayer on the same day. In May 2021, the BBC announced that a second series had been commissioned.

The series differs from the book in several respects. Callum and Sephy are older than in the novels. Also, Callum and Jude's sister, Lynette McGregor, does not have a role.

Synopsis 
The BBC synopsis reads: "Against a background of prejudice, distrust and powerful rebellion mounting on the streets, a passionate romance builds between Sephy and Callum which will lead them both into terrible danger".

Setting 
The series takes place in present-day London in an alternative history where 700 years prior, several nations in (what is in our world known as) West Africa combined to form the powerful Aprican Empire and went on to colonise Europe. After a conflict known as the Great World War, control of Europe is split between different Aprican factions, with mainland Europe under control of the Malian Empire and the Moors, whereas Albion (comprising Great Britain and Ireland) and parts of Scandinavia remain under the thumb of the Aprican Empire.

Russia and the Balkans remain in active conflict with the Aprican colonisers, although since the Great World War their national borders have been pushed back. The Ottoman Empire also exists, still controlling parts of Middle East.

Albion appears to be a self-governing colony with its own (Cross) Prime Minister and executive leadership, an exclusively Cross police force, and a military only just opened up to a small number of Nought high-achievers. However, it is still accountable to the Aprican Empire based on the African continent. As of 1950, racial segregation is rigidly enforced in the colony between those of wealthy Aprican descent (known as Crosses or daggers) and the poorer native Europeans (known as Noughts or blankers).

Cast and characters

Main
 Masali Baduza as Persephone "Sephy" Hadley, the daughter of a Cross politician and childhood friend of Callum
 Jack Rowan as Callum McGregor, one of the first Nought army cadets at Mercy Point and a childhood friend of Sephy
 Helen Baxendale as Meggie McGregor, Callum and Jude's mother and a housekeeper for the Hadley family
 Paterson Joseph as Home Secretary Kamal Hadley 
 Josh Dylan as Jude McGregor, Callum's militant older brother
 Shaun Dingwall as Jack Dorn, leader of the Liberation Militia
 Jonathan Ajayi as Lieutenant Lekan Baako, a military officer and Sephy's boyfriend
 Kiké Brimah as Minerva Hadley, Sephy's older sister
 Rakie Ayola as Prime Minister Opal Folami
 Bonnie Mbuli as Jasmine Hadley, Kamal's wife and Sephy and Minerva's mother
 Ian Hart as Ryan McGregor, Callum and Jude's father and a former militant activist (season 1)

Recurring
 Jodie Tyack as Elaine Sawyer, a Nought cadet at Mercy Point
Michael Dapaah as Mensah (season 2)
Judi Love as Chidi (season 2)
 Nathaniel Ramabulana as Sergeant Major Bolade Oluade, Callum's commanding officer at Mercy Point
Jasmine Jobson as Cara (season 2)
 Nicholas Beveney as Police Deputy Commissioner Folu Abiola
Robert Hands as Clem (season 2)
 Stormzy as Kolawale, Editor-in-Chief of the Ohene Standard
 Jack Bandeira as Carl (Season 1)
 Luke Bailey as Yaro Baloyi-Hadley, Kamal's illegitimate mixed race son
 Eunice Olumide as Omotola Aguda, a news anchor for CAN
 Ore Oduba as Obiora Akintola, a news anchor for CAN
 Kagiso Rathebe as Chidike Akindele (Season 1)

Episodes

Series 1 (2020)

Series 2 (2022)

Production 
In 2016, the BBC announced they were producing an adaptation, to be written by Levi David Addai and Matthew Graham. They had to bow out and Toby Whithouse took over in 2018. Jay Z's company Roc Nation and Participant Media co-produced the series. In November 2018, it was announced Jack Rowan and Masali Baduza were cast as Callum McGregor and Sephy Hadley respectively.

Filming for the series began in November 2018 in South Africa.

On 18 May 2021, the BBC announced that a second series had been commissioned.

Distribution
In New Zealand, the series is available on the free streaming service TVNZ On Demand, while in Australia it was first screened on pay television channel BBC First in September 2020 and is also distributed by Foxtel on their platform. The series premiered on ABC Television in November 2021, and became available on their free streaming platform, ABC iview.

The series was added to the Peacock streaming service in the United States in September 2020. The series is streaming on SonyLIV in India. In Hungary, the series is available on HBO GO.

Soundtrack 
The soundtrack, titled Noughts + Crosses: The Soundtrack, was released on BBC Sounds on 10 February 2020, without track one being available.

Reception
The Guardian Josh Lee gave the television series four out of five stars, describing it as a "reverse-race love story that is vital viewing." Lee praised the series for highlighting the challenges that working-class white people and people of colour share in the real world through its depiction of racism in an alternative world dominated by African supremacy.

See also
 Fable, a 1965 BBC television play by John Hopkins about flipped racial dynamics.
 BabaKiueria, a 1986 Australian mockumentary about an oppressed white minority in a society dominated by Aboriginal Australians.
 White Man's Burden, a 1995 American film about similar subject matter.

References

External links 
 
 

2020 British television series debuts
2020s British drama television series
Alternate history television series
Television shows based on British novels
BBC television dramas
English-language television shows
Television shows filmed in South Africa
Television shows set in London
Television series by Mammoth Screen
Television series by Roc Nation
Race and ethnicity in television